The men's Greco-Roman bantamweight competition at the 1964 Summer Olympics in Tokyo took place from 16 to 19 October at the Komazawa Gymnasium. Nations were limited to one competitor.

Competition format

This Greco-Roman wrestling competition continued to use the "bad points" elimination system introduced at the 1928 Summer Olympics for Greco-Roman and at the 1932 Summer Olympics for freestyle wrestling, as adjusted at the 1960 Summer Olympics. Each bout awarded 4 points. If the victory was by fall, the winner received 0 and the loser 4. If the victory was by decision, the winner received 1 and the loser 3. If the bout was tied, each wrestler received 2 points. A wrestler who accumulated 6 or more points was eliminated. Rounds continued until there were 3 or fewer uneliminated wrestlers. If only 1 wrestler remained, he received the gold medal. If 2 wrestlers remained, point totals were ignored and they faced each other for gold and silver (if they had already wrestled each other, that result was used). If 3 wrestlers remained, point totals were ignored and a round-robin was held among those 3 to determine medals (with previous head-to-head results, if any, counting for this round-robin).

Results

Round 1

Tumasis withdrew after his bout.

 Bouts

 Points

Round 2

Four wrestlers were eliminated, leaving 13 in competition. Švec was the only one to have 0 points.

 Bouts

 Points

Round 3

Five wrestlers were eliminated, leaving 8 in contention. Švec's first loss allowed Ichiguchi to take the lead at 2 points. 

 Bouts

 Points

Round 4

The tie between Ali and Stange eliminated both men; the tie between Švec and Trostianskiy eliminated neither. Beşergil and Pashkulev were also eliminated; Beşergil finished 8th while the other three men eliminated in this round tied for 5th place.

 Bouts

 Points

Round 5

Three out of the four wrestlers were eliminated in this round, including the undefeated Trostianskiy (four wins by decision, one tie) who took silver. Ichiguchi, as the only man left, won the gold medal. The bronze medal tie was decided by the third-round head-to-head matchup between Cernea and Švec, which Švec had won.

 Bouts

 Points

References

Wrestling at the 1964 Summer Olympics